Baron  was a Japanese politician and academic. He was a member of the  House of Peers and a Professor of Law at Tokyo Imperial University. He was the son of Baron Matsuoka Yasutake.

Biography
Born in Tokyo on 28 November 1876, the son of Baron Matsuoka Yasutake, Kinpei graduated from Tokyo Imperial University, Department of Political Science in 1900.

Commissioned by the Ministry of Education in 1902 he became an assistant professor at Imperial University in 1903. As an associate professor, he studies economics abroad in Europe and the United States in 1909, returning to Japan in 1910 upon appointment as a law professor at Tokyo Imperial University. From 1911-1921, he served as a Director at Prince Fumimaro Konoe's East Asia Economic Research Center (Toa Keizai Chosakyoku).

In 1922 he joined Takushoku University as an Academic Supervisor. Matsuoka resigned in 1924 after succeeding his father as baron (danshaku) in the kazoku peerage upon his father's passing in 1923. He then served in the House of Peers until May 1947. The Japan Academy recognized Matsuoka for his academic achievements with the Gomontsuki Ginkabin in 1945.

Matsuoka married the former Nishikawa Yuka and had 3 children, son Yasumitsu, who would go on to be a professor at Nihon University, and two daughters.

References

Kazoku
Academic staff of the University of Tokyo
1876 births
1960 deaths